Centipede is a 3D remake of the 1981 Centipede arcade game from Atari, the original of which was and designed by Ed Logg and Dona Bailey. It was published by Hasbro Interactive in 1998 under the Atari Interactive brand name.

Gameplay consists of a series of rounds that are completed once the player eliminates the centipede(s) that wind down the playing field. Obstacles such as spiders, fleas, and scorpions complicate the game. At the same time, a population of mushrooms grows between the player and each centipede. Optionally, the player is tasked with rescuing villagers and bystanders and preventing damage to key structures; although ignoring these tasks does not prevent the player from being able to complete the round regardless.

Gameplay

The game can be played in two game modes: "Arcade" and "Adventure" — the latter marking a departure from the original version. Arcade mode allows the player to experience a ported version of the original arcade Centipede, with some enhancements.

In the adventure campaign, one completes a series of levels linked by a storyline. Here, the player encounters both the original enemies (centipede, spider, flea, scorpion, poisonous mushroom) and a new array as well (dragonfly, butterfly, firebug, icebug, killer mushroom, etc.), some of which are capable of throwing projectiles to destroy the shooter, and others capable of altering mushrooms. If an enemy or projectile contacts the shooter, the player loses a life.

Campaign story
The story centers around a collective of villages known as "Weedom" and a prophecy that foretells their imminent destruction. Each century, an army of large insects invades Weedom at the hands of their leader, the Queen Pede. The player assumes the role of Wally Gudmunzsun, who is tasked with the destruction of the invading insect army, while piloting a craft known simply as "The Shooter".

Reception

Chris Charla reviewed the PlayStation version of the game for Next Generation, rating it three stars out of five, complimenting the gameplay and the story.

Adam Pavlacka reviewed the Dreamcast version of the game for Next Generation, rating it three stars out of five.

The game received poor to mediocre review scores. GameSpot criticized the controls and camera, giving it an overall rating of 6.9, equivalent to "fair".

The game won Computer Games Strategy Pluss 1998 "Classic Game of the Year" award. The editors praised the graphics, addictive gameplay and the game's enhancements.

References

1998 video games
Dreamcast games
PlayStation (console) games
PlayStation Network games
Shoot 'em ups
Video game remakes
Video games about insects
Video games developed in the United States
Windows games
Multiplayer and single-player video games
MacSoft games
Westlake Interactive games